USS Thrasher may refer to:

 USS Thrasher (SS-26), which served before World War I, was renamed G-4 before she was launched.
 USS Thrasher was a civilian motorboat commissioned during World War I eventually renamed to only her hull number, SP-546.
 , was a  that served during the early Cold War.

See also
 

United States Navy ship names